Richard Anthony Croce (born September 16, 1985), known professionally as MC Bravado, is an American rapper, songwriter, and educator from White Plains, New York.

He is best known for his remix EP "XEMIR" released in 2019. The EP featured New York City rap artist Nitty Scott

Career
Richard Croce was born in White Plains, New York. He released his first album "Dope Perspective" which was a collaborative release featuring fellow rapper C-Nature in 2011. MC Bravado followed up the next year in 2012 by releasing his debut solo album "The Illy-Ad". In 2014 he released his first solo EP "Walk The Line". MC Bravado gained national attention for his first collaborative single "Unfiltered" in 2017. That same year, MC Bravado followed with the releases of singles "This Is Gold" feat. OnCue & "Go Westbrook". Both singles were featured on his second album "Hip-Hop*" also released in 2017. In 2018, MC Bravado released his 3rd studio album "Like Water For Hangovers". The following year in 2019, MC Bravado released his critically acclaimed XEMIR(Remix EP). In March 2020, MC Bravado released his latest single "Dirty 30". In the summer of 2020, MC Bravado released his 4th studio album "The Living Game", with lead single "Like Kobe" featuring rap artist Joell Ortiz produced by Height (musician). In April 2021, MC Bravado released "Yeah Baby".

Outside of his rap career, MC Bravado is also a teacher in Baltimore, Maryland.

Discography

Albums and EPs

Singles

References

External links
MC Bravado Official Instagram

1985 births
Living people